Sumner is an unincorporated community, 12 miles west of Paris, in Lamar County, Texas, United States.  The ZIP Code for Sumner is 75486

The North Lamar Independent School District serves area students.

History
Named to honor an early settler, Moses Sumner, the town had a post office open in 1885. By 1891 the population was 100, and the town was well on its way to prosperity. In 1892 the population was up to 150, and by 1898 the town had a one-teacher school with sixty-three students. In the late 1920s the population was 250 but without a railroad. With the Great Depression and post-war increased mobility, people moved away. In 1983 the town had a business, a school, one church, and a factory. The population was eighty in 2000.

References

External links
 

Unincorporated communities in Texas
Unincorporated communities in Lamar County, Texas